Berkshire Community Foundation(BCF) is an English charity and community foundation which over the past 30 years has made grants totaling over £13 million to more than 3,000 local projects in Berkshire  and raised more than £10 million which is invested in a long term endowment fund.

Berkshire Community Foundation is one of 46 accredited Community Foundations in the UK. These Foundations are all members of the umbrella organisation UK Community Foundations.

HRH Princess Beatrice became patron of BCF on 1 July 2014

In 2011, Berkshire Community Foundation was selected as one of the beneficiaries of the Prince William and Miss Catherine Middleton Charitable Gift Fund

References

Charities based in Berkshire
UK Community Foundations